Kurbatikha is a rural locality (a village) in Paustovskoye Rural Settlement, Vyaznikovsky District, Vladimir Oblast, Russia. The population was 27 as of 2010.

Geography 
Kurbatikha is located on the Motra River, 43 km southwest of Vyazniki (the district's administrative centre) by road. Aleshkovo is the nearest rural locality.

References 

Rural localities in Vyaznikovsky District